The Samyang Optics / Rokinon AF 35mm F2.8 FE is a wide-angle full-frame prime lens for Sony E-mount. It was announced by Samyang Optics on June 5, 2017.

Though designed for Sony's full frame E-mount cameras, the lens can be used on Sony's APS-C E-mount camera bodies, with an equivalent full-frame field-of-view of 52.5mm.

Build quality
The lens itself is made of a thin aluminum shell over plastic internals and includes a detachable pancake-style lens hood.

This lens is comparable to Sony's own 35mm lens, featuring similar specs and image quality.

See also
 List of third-party E-mount lenses
 List of Sony E-mount lenses

References

Camera lenses introduced in 2017
35
Pancake lenses